Rosie's Rules is a  children's animated television series that premiered on October 3, 2022 on PBS Kids and on 
TVOKids on October 11, 2022. The show is produced by 9 Story Media Group and its animation division Brown Bag Films.

The TV show is flash animated with Toon Boom Harmony.

Plot
The series follows 5-year-old Rosie Fuentes as she investigates and learns about the area around her San Antonio, Texas home. Through a multi-cultural (Mexican, southwestern, and midwestern) lens as her father is from Mexico City and her mother is from Wisconsin, she learns about community with her cat Gatita. The show is primary in English but it blends in Spanish words and phrases.

Characters

Main
 Rosie Fuentes (voiced by Ellora López (speaking) and Ana Sofia Ferrer (singing))
 Gatita (voiced by Denise Oliver) 
 Crystal Fuentes (voiced by Gabby Clarke)
 Iggy Fuentes (voiced by Oscar Whalen)
 Marco Fuentes/Papa (voiced by Carlos Díaz)
 Liz Fuentes/Mom (voiced by Denise Oliver)

Supporting
 Beatriz Gomez/Abuela (voiced by Amanda Martinez)
 Tia Margarita (voiced by Paloma Nuñez)
 Javi Gomez (voiced by Desmond Sivan)
 Jun Liu (voiced by Emma Ho)
 Quinn Liu (voiced by Ian Ho)
 Grandpa Liu (voiced by Russell Yuen)

Episodes

References

External links
 
 

2020s American animated television series
2020s American children's comedy television series
2022 American television series debuts
2020s Canadian animated television series
2020s Canadian children's television series
2022 Canadian television series debuts
2020s preschool education television series
American children's animated comedy television series
American children's animated musical television series 
American flash animated television series
American preschool education television series
Canadian children's animated comedy television series
Canadian children's animated musical television series
Canadian flash animated television series
Canadian preschool education television series
Animated preschool education television series
Hispanic and Latino American television
English-language education television programming
Spanish-language education television programming
PBS Kids shows
PBS original programming
Animated television series about children
Animated television series about families
Animated television series about siblings
Television series by 9 Story Media Group
Television series by Brown Bag Films
Television series impacted by the COVID-19 pandemic
Television shows set in Ohio